Eighties Vinyl Records is a not-for-Profit independent English record label based in Liverpool. The label only releases vinyl records by new local artists, as well as some more established bands.

History
Eighties Vinyl Records was formed in 2012 by Dave Hewitson after winning an auction for a day in a recording studio. The Sand Band who had recently departed from their own record label, Deltasonic, said they would record the first single for the new label. On 17 July The Sand Band went into 'Track Studios' in Liverpool City Centre to record a single.

On 2 Nov 2012 the first Eighties Vinyl Record single was released, The Sand Band single 'When We Kiss', a limited edition white vinyl pressing.

In 2013 the label was nominated for a Liverpool Music Award.

On 21 April 2018 EVR announced that they will be producing a limited edition 12 track vinyl LP of the soundtrack of the 2009 film 'Awaydays', never previously released on vinyl. The music of Awaydays is pivotal to the film and comprises post-punk and electronic music, appropriate for the film's setting and atmosphere, focused on the music of Ultravox and Joy Division.

Discography

7" Singles
The Sand Band, 'When We Kiss' (7" Single, White) EVR001	2012	
The Troubadours,	'Con Edison' (7" Single, Red) EVR002	2013	
Sankofa 'Siren Song' (7" Single) EVR003	2013	
The Thespians, 'Under Siege' (7" Single, White)	EVR005 2013
The Merrylees, 'For You/The Coroner' (7" Single, Cream)	 EVR006 2013	
Cold Shoulder	'Tears For Me' (7", Single,)  EVR009 2013	
The Sister Ruby Band, 'Oh Mercy' (7", Single,) EVR010 2013
Sunstack Jones	'You Can Help Me Out' (7", Single) EVR011 2013
Ian Prowse / Dan Donnelly 'Rosalita/Cecilia' (7", Single, Green) EVR012	2013	
The Balcony Stars, 'She's Going Down/Restless' (7", Single) EVR014 2013
Aviator 'Desolation Peaks' (7", Single) EVR015 2013	
The Reflections, 'Out Of My Hands' (7", Single,) EVR018 2014	
Sunstack Jones	'Bet I Could' (7", Single,) EVR019 2014	
Mike Badger And The Shady Trio, 'John Got Shot' (7", Single) EVR020 2014	
Beach Skulls 'Dreamin' Blue' (7", Single,) EVR021 2014
Sankofa Slow Killer City / Vanishing Point (7", Single, Ltd, Picture disc) EVR 024  2015
The Stairs Shit Town (7",Single,) EVR025  2015
Space Blow Up Doll (7", Single, Pink ) EVR026   2016
The Cheap Thrills Glare EP (7", EP)   EVR027   2017
The Stands Some Weekend Night feat Noel Gallagher (7", Single, Ltd, Splatter vinyl)   EVR028   2017
The La's Open Your Heart (7", EP)  EVR029   2018
The Celtic Social Club / Ian Prowse and Amsterdam Remember Joe Strummer/Joe's Kiss. EVR030   2019

10" EP
Sankofa 'Sankofa' (10", EP, Orange) EP001 2013

12" LP
Various Eighties Vinyl Records - Just Records (LP, Compilation) LP001 2013
Various Awaydays Soundtrack (LP, Compilation) LP002 
Various Awaydays II (LP, Compilation) LP003
Various The Business Soundtrack (LP, Compilation) LP004  
The La's Breakloose 1985/86 (LP,) LP005 
The La's Callin' All 1986/87 (LP,) LP006 
Various Scouse Soul (LP, Compilation) LP007
Various The Football Factory Soundtrack (LP, Compilation) LP008 
Various Stars Are Stars (LP, Compilation) LP009
Various The Firm Soundtrack (LP, Compilation) LP010
The La's live 1986/87 (LP,) LP011 
Various The Firm '89 (LP, Compilation) LP012

12" EP
The Cheap Thrills Vue Du Monde (12" Mini Album) EP002

7" PROMO
Sankofa 'Whitewood Sessions' (7", Promo) Promo 001 2013

References

Non-profit organisations based in England
English record labels
British independent record labels